The Paraguay men's national volleyball team represents Paraguay in international volleyball competitions. In the 1950s the squad twice won a medal (silver and bronze) at the South American Championship, and won another bronze medal in 1979 in Rosario, Argentina.

Tournament Records

FIVB World Championship
 1960 - 12th place

See also
 Paraguay women's national volleyball team

References

Sports123
FIVB Senior World Ranking - Men. (2016, August 22). Retrieved March 24, 2017
Napout, O. E. (2017, March 24). Paraguayans men's national volleyball team [Personal interview]. Former manager of the Paraguayans men's national volleyball team
https://drive.google.com/open?id=0B8ZYr1ZUU1t6VzJOVzZVTGhIdE0

Volleyball
National men's volleyball teams
Men's sport in Paraguay
Volleyball in Paraguay